List of chairmen of the Council of State of Oman since December 1997, when the Council was established.

This is a list of chairmen speakers of the Council of State of Oman:

Sources

Politics of Oman
Oman, Council of State
1997 establishments in Oman
Oman politics-related lists